Kõo Parish was a rural municipality of Estonia, in Viljandi County. It had a population of 1,194 (as of 1 January 2009) and an area of 149.46 km².

Settlements

Twinnings

Kõo Parish has twinned with 3 municipalities:
 Köyliö, Finland  (1991)
 Nora, Sweden (1991)
 Fladungen, Germany (1996)

References

External links